Imaus is a genus of tussock moths in the family Erebidae. The genus was erected by Frederic Moore in 1879.

Species
The following species are included in the genus:
Imaus lata Holland, 1893
Imaus munda Walker, 1855

References

Lymantriini
Noctuoidea genera